Test-retest may refer to:
Test-retest reliability
Monitoring (medicine) by performing frequent tests